The Derbyshire Police and Crime Commissioner is the police and crime commissioner, an elected official tasked with setting out the way crime is tackled by Derbyshire Police in the English County of Derbyshire. The post was created in November 2012, following an election held on 15 November 2012, and replaced the Derbyshire Police Authority. The current incumbent is Angelique Foster, who represents the Conservative Party.

List of Derbyshire Police and Crime Commissioners

External links

References

Police and crime commissioners in England